Anthia venator is a beetle of the Family Carabidae.

Description
These beetles are the biggest carabids of North Africa. They spend daylight hours hidden in burrows at the base of the bushes. Usually they hunt various insects at sunset.

Distribution and habitat
This species is widespread in North Africa, in Algeria, Egypt, Libya, Morocco, Syria and Tunisia. These ground beetles prefer sandy habitats.

References
 Biolib
 Jcringenbach.free.fr
 Carabidae.org
 Coleop-terra

External links

Anthiinae (beetle)
Beetles described in 1792